The McIntosh Corner Historic District is a historic district encompassing an area that was formerly the principal town center of Needham, Massachusetts. The district was added to the National Register of Historic Places in 1989.

Description and history
The town of Needham, a suburb west of Boston, was settled in the early 18th century and incorporated in 1711. The approximate routes of both Great Plain Avenue and Central Street were originally trails used by Native Americans, and were developed into roads by the colonial settlers. Opposition to the routing of the railroad parallel to Central Avenue through the center and this junction resulted in its placement further to the east in 1853, after which the area declined in importance.

The most prominent building in the district is the Presbyterian Church, a modern building. It is the cohesive character of the residential buildings that gives the district its character. Virtually all of them are wood-frame structures,  stories in height, and between 3 and 5 bays wide. Most are five bays wide, a typical late colonial or Federal period form, with a center entrance and two interior chimneys. The oldest house in the district, the Daniel Kingsbury House (1794), is typical of this form. Originally Federal in style, it was later modified with Greek Revival and Colonial Revival alterations.

See also
National Register of Historic Places listings in Norfolk County, Massachusetts

References

Historic districts in Norfolk County, Massachusetts
Buildings and structures in Needham, Massachusetts
National Register of Historic Places in Norfolk County, Massachusetts
Historic districts on the National Register of Historic Places in Massachusetts